Love Storm is the fifth studio album by American soul/R&B group Tavares, released in 1977 on the Capitol label.

Commercial performance
The album peaked at No. 15 on the R&B albums chart. It also reached No. 59 on the Billboard 200. The album features the singles "Whodunit", which peaked at No. 1 on the Hot Soul Singles chart and No. 22 on the Billboard Hot 100, and "Goodnight My Love", which reached No. 14 on the Hot Soul Singles chart.

Track listing

Personnel 
James Gadson – drums
John Barnes, Sonny Burke, Freddie Perren – keyboards
Scott Edwards – bass
Bob "Boogie" Bowles – guitar
Paulinho da Costa – congas
Bob Zimmitti, Freddie Perren – percussion
Freda Payne – special guest vocals on "I Wanna See You Soon"

Charts
Album

Singles

References

External links

1977 albums
Tavares (group) albums
Albums produced by Freddie Perren
Albums recorded at United Western Recorders
Albums recorded at Total Experience Recording Studios
Capitol Records albums